Yongzhou railway station (Chinese: 永州站) is a railway station in Lengshuitan District, Yongzhou, Hunan, China.

The station is under the Hengyang section of China Railway Guangzhou Group, and has five platforms.

History
Yongzhou railway station opened on its current site on 18 April 2004, replacing the older Yongzhou railway station which was simultaneously renamed Yongzhou East. All passenger services transferred to the new station and Yongzhou East became a freight-only station.

References

Railway stations in Hunan
Railway stations in China opened in 2004